Stenocactus multicostatus, the brain cactus, is a member of the cactus family native to the deserts of Mexico, and is popular in the gardening community. Though it has only been reported in the shrublands of Chihuahua, Coahuila, Durango, Nuevo León, San Luis Potosí, Zacatecas, and Tamaulipas, it has yet to be assessed using the IUCN Categories and Criteria because its taxonomy is still unclear.

It grows up to 2.5 in (6 cm) tall, 2.4 to 4 in (6–10 cm) wide. It has nearly 100 thin ribs around the outside, each with six to nine spines. The upper spines are wider, at 1.6 to 3.2 in (4–8 cm) long, while the lower ones are shorter, at 0.2 to 0.6 in (5–15 mm) long. The flower is white to purple, 0.8 to 2 in (2–5 cm) in diameter with many stamens.

References

Cactoideae
Taxa named by Alwin Berger